Steatogenys is a genus of gymnotiform knifefishes found in the Amazon, Orinoco and Essequibo river basins in tropical South America. The two remaining species are less common and widespread, with A. duidae found mainly in small streams running through terra firme forests (forest that does not flood, unlike várzea) and S. ocellatus among submerged roots and branches in static or slow-flowing blackwater habitats. All three are regularly found among vegetation in floating meadows, a habitat that often contains little oxygen, but they are well-adapted to this.

They are well-camouflaged and brown in color with a barred pattern. They feed on invertebrates such as aquatic insect larvae and small shrimp.

Taxonomy and species
Steatogenys has traditionally been included in the family Hypopomidae, but a comprehensive molecular study from 2015 showed it belongs in Rhamphichthyidae, and this has been followed by recent authorities.

There are currently three recognized species in this genus:

 Steatogenys duidae (La Monte, 1929)
 Steatogenys elegans (Steindachner, 1880) (Barred knifefish)
 Steatogenys ocellatus Crampton, Thorsen & Albert, 2004

References

Hypopomidae
Freshwater fish of South America
Freshwater fish genera
Ray-finned fish genera
Taxa named by George Albert Boulenger